Jane Holzer (née Brukenfeld; born October 23, 1940), is an American art collector and film producer who was previously an actress, model, and Warhol superstar. She was often known by the nickname Baby Jane Holzer. She was also known as a 1960s fashion icon.

Biography

The daughter of real estate investor Carl Brukenfeld, she married Leonard Holzer, an heir to a New York real estate fortune. Holzer was noted for including art projects in his developments, particularly at the Smith Haven Mall.

Movies she appeared in included Andy Warhol's Soap Opera (1964), Couch (1964), and Camp (1965), and the independently produced Ciao! Manhattan (1972). She co-produced the 1985 film Kiss of the Spider Woman. Holzer is the subject of "Girl of the Year" in Tom Wolfe's The Kandy-Kolored Tangerine-Flake Streamline Baby (1965) and is referenced twice in the 1972 Roxy Music single "Virginia Plain".

Holzer appeared in Warhol's Batman Dracula (1964). In turn, she was parodied as Baby Jane Towser in the 1967 Batman episode "Pop/Flop Goes the Joker", where she was played by Diana Ivarson. That same year, she played herself at a New York party in the pilot episode  of the short-lived TV series, Coronet Blue.

In 1966, Holzer was named one of the "fashion revolutionaries" in New York by Women's Wear Daily, alongside Edie Sedgwick, Tiger Morse, Pierre Cardin, Paco Rabanne, Rudi Gernreich, André Courrèges, Emanuel Ungaro, Yves Saint Laurent, and Mary Quant.

She released the single "Rapunzel"/"Nowhere" in 1967 on Atco Records, produced by Al Kasha and arranged by Barry Goldberg.

Personal life
She was one of the attendants at the wedding of Mary McFadden and Philip Harari in 1964. 

Her son, Charles Holzer, competed for the United States Virgin Islands at the 1992 Summer Olympics in show jumping, and his wife Ashley Holzer is a dressage rider who won a bronze medal for Canada at the 1988 Summer Olympics.

References

 "Jane Holzer in Landlordland", by Josh Barbanel, New York Times, August 14, 2009.

External links
 
Baby Jane Holzer biography at warholstars.org

Living people
1940 births
People associated with The Factory